Vice-Admiral Edmund Gerard Noel Rushbrooke, CBE, DSC (15 December 1892 – 9 October 1972) was a Royal Navy officer.

Naval career
Rushbrooke served in the Second World War as commanding officer of the aircraft carrier HMS Argus from August 1940 and of the aircraft carrier HMS Eagle from April 1941. Rushbrooke survived and went on to be Director of Naval Intelligence in November 1942.

References

Sources
 

1892 births
1972 deaths
Royal Navy admirals
Directors of Naval Intelligence
Commanders of the Order of the British Empire
Recipients of the Distinguished Service Cross (United Kingdom)
Admiralty personnel of World War II